Intimate Contact is a 1987 British television drama starring Daniel Massey, Claire Bloom, David Phelan and Abigail Cruttenden, which deals with the issue of the HIV/AIDS virus. Written by Alma Cullen and directed by Waris Hussein, the series was produced for Central Television, and aired on the ITV network in three hour-long episodes in March 1987. In the United States, it was later shown in two 90-minute episodes on the HBO channel. Massey and Bloom were both nominated in the Best Actor categories at the 1989 CableACE Awards. Massey subsequently won the accolade.

Plot summary

Daniel Massey stars as Clive Gregory, a businessman who contracts AIDS during a business trip to New York, where he has sex with a prostitute. The disease is diagnosed 18 months after the trip when he is hospitalized with viral pneumonia. Clive's wife, Ruth (played by Bloom) is devastated by the news, and as the nature of Clive's condition becomes public knowledge the Gregorys face hostility and ignorance from friends, colleagues and those in the local community. As Clive's health deteriorates, Ruth campaigns for AIDS awareness. Clive also meets other people whose lives have been affected by HIV and AIDS.

Awards and nominations

References

External links

1987 British television series debuts
1987 British television series endings
1980s British drama television series
ITV television dramas
HIV/AIDS in British films
Television series by ITV Studios
English-language television shows
Television shows produced by Central Independent Television
HIV/AIDS in television